Sater may refer to:

People
 Almir Sater, Brazilian singer-songwriter and actor
 David Sater, politician in Missouri, USA
 Dorothy Hayes Sater, a TV reporter in Omaha, Nebraska, USA
 Felix Sater (born 1966), a Russian-American mobster, real estate developer associated with Donald Trump
 John Elbert Sater, U.S. federal judge
 Paul Abdel Sater, bishop of the Maronite Catholic Patriarchate of Antioch
 Steven Sater, American playwright and screenwriter

Places
 Säter, a small city in central Sweden
 Säter Municipality based on Säter

See also
 Satter, a surname